Christiane Harzendorf (born 28 December 1967 in Borna) is a German rower.

References

External links 
 https://www.rudern.de/
 https://www.gtp.gr/TDirectoryDetails.asp?ID=50569

1967 births
Living people
German female rowers
People from Borna
Rowers at the 1992 Summer Olympics
Olympic bronze medalists for Germany
Olympic rowers of Germany
Olympic medalists in rowing
Medalists at the 1992 Summer Olympics
World Rowing Championships medalists for East Germany
World Rowing Championships medalists for Germany
Sportspeople from Saxony